"Bread and circuses" (or bread and games; from Latin: panem et circenses) is a metonymic phrase referring to superficial appeasement. It is attributed to Juvenal, a Roman poet active in the late first and early second century CE, and is used commonly in cultural, particularly political, contexts.

In a political context, the phrase means to generate public approval, not by excellence in public service or public policy, but by diversion, distraction, or by satisfying the most immediate or base requirements of a populace, by offering a palliative:  for example food (bread) or entertainment (circuses).

Juvenal originally used it to decry the "selfishness" of common people and their neglect of wider concerns. The phrase implies a population's erosion or ignorance of civic duty as a priority.

Ancient Rome

This phrase originates from Rome in Satire X of the Roman satirical poet Juvenal. In context, the Latin panem et circenses (bread and circuses) identifies the only remaining interest of a Roman populace that no longer cares for its historical birthright of political involvement. Here Juvenal displays his contempt for the declining heroism of contemporary Romans, using a range of different themes, including lust for power and desire for old age to illustrate his argument.

Juvenal here makes reference to the Roman practice of providing free wheat to Roman citizens as well as costly circus games and other forms of entertainment as a means of gaining political power. The Annona (grain dole) was begun under the instigation of the aristocratic popularis politician Gaius Sempronius Gracchus in 123 BCE; it remained an object of political contention until it was taken under the control of the autocratic Roman emperors.

See also

 
 
 
"Bread and Circuses" (Star Trek: The Original Series), a 1968 episode of Star Trek
 
 
 
 
 
 
 
 List of Latin phrases
 
 
 
 Theatre state

Notes

Sources
Potter, D. and D. Mattingly, Life, Death, and Entertainment in the Roman Empire. Ann Arbor (1999).
Rickman, G., The Corn Supply of Ancient Rome Oxford (1980).

Further reading

Juvenal's 16 "Satires" in Latin, at The Latin Library
Juvenal's first 3 "Satires" in English

English phrases
Ancient Roman culture
Crowd psychology
Latin philosophical phrases
Metaphors referring to food and drink